Norbert Dąbrowski (born 26 August 1988) is a Polish professional boxer.

Boxing career 

Dąbrowski professional boxing debut 17 September 2010 in Olsztyn where he defeated by TKO first round Andrejs Suliko.

In 12 December 2016 Dąbrowski he will compete in Canada with Eleider Alvarez for WBC Light heavyweight nr.1 pretender.

Professional boxing record

References

External links 
 

Living people
Polish male boxers
1988 births
Boxers from Warsaw
Super-middleweight boxers
Light-heavyweight boxers